The Naval Strike Missile (NSM) is an anti-ship and land-attack missile developed by the Norwegian company Kongsberg Defence & Aerospace (KDA).

The original Norwegian name was Nytt sjømålsmissil (literally "New sea target missile", indicating that it is the successor of the Penguin missile). The English marketing name Naval Strike Missile was adopted later. According to Kongsberg the NSM/JSM is selected by Norway, Poland, Malaysia, Germany, the United States (as RGM-184), Japan, Romania, Canada, Australia and Spain as of 2022.

The Joint Strike Missile (JSM) is a multi-role air-launched version of the NSM currently in development.

Development

The Naval Strike Missile's initial serial production contract was signed in June 2007. It has been chosen by the Royal Norwegian Navy for its s and s. In December 2008 the NSM was selected by the Polish Navy, which ordered fifty land-based missiles (including two for testing) in deals made in 2008 and 2011, with delivery planned for 2013–2016. The final milestone was completed in June 2011 with tests at Point Mugu. On 12 April 2011, the Norwegian Ministry of Defense announced phase 2 of development.

On October 10, 2012, the Royal Norwegian Navy fired an NSM for the first time. The vessel in question was the HNoMS Glimt, a Skjold-class patrol boat. On Wednesday, June 5, 2013, the Royal Norwegian Navy made the first test firing of an NSM missile carrying a live warhead against a target vessel. The decommissioned  HNoMS Trondheim was hit and the munition functioned as intended.

In June 2013 Poland completed the Coastal Missile Division equipped with 12 NSMs and 23 vehicles on Jelcz chassis (including 6 launchers, 2 TRS-15C radars, 6 fire control vehicles, and 3 command vehicles). Ultimately, the Coastal Missile Division will be equipped with 12 launchers carrying 4 missiles each for a total of 48 missiles. In December 2014 Poland ordered a second batch of launchers and missiles to equip a Naval Strike Missile battalion.

In late July 2014, the U.S. Navy confirmed that the NSM would be tested aboard the littoral combat ship . The test occurred successfully on 24 September 2014. Kongsberg and Raytheon teamed to pitch the NSM to equip the LCS as its over-the-horizon anti-ship missile in 2015. By May 2017, the extended-range Boeing RGM-84 Harpoon and Lockheed Martin LRASM had been withdrawn from the Navy's Over-the-Horizon Weapon System (OTH-WS) competition, leaving the NSM as the only remaining contender. On 31 May 2018, the Navy officially selected the NSM to serve as the LCS' OTH anti-ship weapon. The $14.8 million initial contract award to Raytheon calls for the delivery of Kongsberg-designed "encanistered missiles loaded into launching mechanisms; and a single fire control suite,” and buys about a dozen missiles; the entire contract value could grow to $847.6 million if all contract options are exercised. The Navy plans to deploy the NSM in late 2019. The NSM will be designated as the RGM-184A in US service.

During RIMPAC 2014 the frigate Fridtjof Nansen made a successful firing of the NSM during a SINKEX, with the missile impacting and detonating as designed.

In the LIMA exhibition 2015, Malaysia announced that the Naval Strike Missile had won the contract to fulfil the Royal Malaysian Navy's Maharaja Lela-class's anti-ship missile requirement.

In February 2017, the Norwegian government announced that the German Navy will acquire "a significant amount" of Naval Strike Missiles under a deal valued at "more than 10 billion NOK".

During RIMPAC 2018, USARPAC fired a Naval Strike Missile from the shore to sink a ship.

In October 2019 the USS Gabrielle Giffords fired off a Naval Strike Missile at a surplus US Navy frigate, USS Ford, which was towed close to Guam, in the Pacific, to act as a target in a SINKEX.

The NSM is to be used by the U.S. Marine Corps as part of the Navy/Marine Expeditionary Ship Interdiction System (NMESIS), which places an NSM launcher unit on an unmanned JLTV-based mobile launch platform to enable the Marines to fire anti-ship missiles from land.

Design and features 

The state-of-the-art design and use of composite materials is meant to give the missile sophisticated stealth capabilities. NSM is designed for littoral waters ("brown water") as well as for open sea ("green water and blue water") scenarios. The usage of a high strength titanium alloy blast/fragmentation warhead from TDW is in line with the modern lightweight design and features insensitive high-explosive. Warhead initiation is by a void-sensing Programmable Intelligent Multi-Purpose Fuze designed to optimise effect against hard targets.

Like its Penguin predecessor, NSM is able to fly over and around landmasses, travel in sea skim mode, and then make random manoeuvres in the terminal phase, making it harder to stop by enemy countermeasures. While the Penguin is a yaw-to-turn missile, NSM is based on bank-to-turn flight (see Yaw (flight) and flight control). In 2016, it was confirmed by the Royal Norwegian Navy that NSM also can attack land targets.

The target selection technology provides NSM with a capacity for independent detection, recognition, and discrimination of targets at sea or on the coast. This is possible by the combination of an imaging infrared (IIR) seeker and an onboard target database. NSM is able to navigate by GPS, inertial and terrain reference systems.

After being launched into the air by a solid rocket booster which is jettisoned upon burning out, the missile is propelled to its target in high subsonic speed by a turbojet sustainer engine—leaving the 125 kg multi-purpose blast/fragmentation warhead to do its work, which in case of a ship target means impacting the ship at or near the water line.

An NSM coastal battery consists of three missile launch vehicles (MLV), one battery command vehicle (BCV), three combat command vehicles (CCV), one mobile communication center (MCC), one mobile radar vehicle (MRV) with TRS-15C radar, one transport and loading vehicle (TLV), and one mobile workshop vehicle (MWV). When installed on ships, NSMs can be deck-mounted in packs of one, two, three, four, or six launchers.

Operators

Current operators

Royal Norwegian Navy

Polish Navy
Coastal Missile Squadron

U.S. Navy

U.S. Marine Corps

Future operators

Royal Australian Navy

Royal Canadian Navy
Canadian Surface Combatant

German Navy

 Royal Netherlands Navy

Royal Malaysian Navy

 Romanian Navy Delivery expected finished Q4 2028.

 Spanish Navy
Álvaro de Bazán-class frigate
F110-class frigate

 Royal Navy (a total of 11 vessels from the Type 23 and Type 45 classes to be equipped)
Type 23 Frigate
Type 45 Destroyer

 Latvian Land Forces

Potential operators

 Ukrainian Navy

 Indian Navy

 Indonesian Navy

See also
SOM Cruise Missile
Naval anti ship missile -MR
ATMACA
Neptune
Kh-35
Harpoon
Exocet
Sea Eagle
Sea Killer
RBS-15
BrahMos
Otomat
C-802
YJ-12
Type 80 Air-to-Ship Missile
Type 88 Surface-to-Ship Missile
Type 90 Ship-to-Ship Missile
Type 93 Air-to-Ship Missile
Sea Breaker

References

External links 

Official NSM product page at KDA
Official JSM product page at KDA
Defpro.com:Norway conducted very successful NSM test firing (Febr 2009)
Missile.index search – Choose Development-Country: "Norway", then click "Search", then pick "NSM" from the results list (direct linking N/A)
Kongsberg test fires Naval Strike Missiles – Jane's Navy International, 8 August 2006
Capital Markets Day 2007 Kongsberg Defence & Aerospace

Anti-ship cruise missiles of Norway
Anti-ship missiles of Norway
Kongsberg Gruppen
Surface-to-surface missiles
Military equipment introduced in the 2010s
Anti-ship missiles of the United States